Praful Shantilal Mehta (born 1938) was an Tanzanian cricketer. He played one One day International representing East Africa in the 1975 World Cup.

External links
 Cricinfo Praful Mehta

1938 births
East Africa One Day International cricketers
Living people
Tanzanian cricketers
Cricketers at the 1975 Cricket World Cup
Wicket-keepers